In the event of "grave disorder" breaking out in the House of Commons of the United Kingdom, the Speaker has the power to suspend or to adjourn the sitting. The power derives from a standing order for public business, which states in its current form:

The rule was introduced on 17 February 1902 as a resolution: as proposed the Speaker could act "if in the interests of order he thinks it desirable"; as agreed it was "in the case of grave disorder arising ... if he thinks it necessary". This was initially a Sessional Order, effective only for that session.  It was made permanent (a "Standing Order of the House") on 1 December 1902. It was amended to its current wording as part of a general revision of standing orders effected on 28 July 1948. The rules for televising the Commons require the broadcast to focus on the Speaker (or other occupant of the Chair) during "grave disorder", defined as "incidents of individual, but more likely collective, misconduct of such a serious disruptive nature as to place in jeopardy the continuation of the sitting". Broadcasters were unhappy with this restriction.

Meetings of standing committees are governed by separate rules of procedure, though their chairperson has similar powers, exercised for example by Roger Gale at the committee stage of the Criminal Justice and Police Bill 2001. In the Commons chamber, the Deputy Speaker or other temporary occupant of the Speaker's chair can invoke S.O. 46. However, a Committee of the Whole House (as for the committee stage of important bills) is chaired by the Deputy Speaker sitting as Chairman of Ways and Means not in the Speaker's chair. If grave disorder arises, he must call for order, rise as Chairman of Ways and Means, wait for the mace to be replaced, sit in the Speaker's chair, and then stand, before he may invoke S.O. 46.

The following table lists all the occasions on grave disorder has occasioned suspension or adjournment under this Standing Order.

Footnotes

References

House of Commons of the United Kingdom
Incidents of grave disorder in the British House of Commons
Incidents of grave disorder in the British House of Commons